The Marriage of the Virgin is the subject in Christian art depicting the marriage of the Virgin Mary and Saint Joseph. The wedding ceremony is not mentioned in the canonical Gospels but is covered in several apocryphal sources and in later redactions, notably the 14th century compilation the Golden Legend. Unlike many other scenes in Life of the Virgin cycles (like the Nativity of Mary and Presentation of Mary), it is not a feast in the church calendar, though it sometimes has been in the past.

In the Eastern Orthodox tradition, essentially the same scene, with very similar iconography, is considered to represent the earlier scene of the "Entrusting of Mary to Joseph", with Joseph being made Mary's guardian by the temple authorities.  

In art the subject could be covered in several different scenes, and the betrothal of Mary, with Joseph's blossoming rod, was often shown, despite its apocryphal origin. The wedding procession may also be shown, especially in the Early Medieval period. Giotto's famous fresco cycle in the Scrovegni Chapel (1303) covers the story in four scenes. By the later Middle Ages and Renaissance the betrothal and marriage were often shown as a single scene, with the disappointed suitors holding their bare rods, or snapping them. 

The lack of scriptural backing for the details, and the fall from fashion of predelle, led to it falling into disfavour in the Counter-Reformation.

The feast for the Espousals of the Blessed Virgin Mary, now only celebrated by some parts of the Catholic Church, is on January 23.

The betrothal legend in the Golden Legend

The Golden Legend, which derives its account from the much older Gospel of Pseudo-Matthew, recounts how, when Mary was 14 and living in the Temple, the High Priest gathered all male descendants of David of marriageable age including Saint Joseph. The High Priest ordered them to each bring a rod; he that owned the rod which would bear flowers was divinely ordained to become Mary's husband. After the Holy Spirit descended as a dove and caused Joseph's rod to blossom, he and Mary were wed according to Jewish custom. The account, quoted in its entirety, runs thus:

In fact, neither the Golden Legend nor any of the early apocryphal accounts describe the actual ceremony, and they differ as to its timing, other than that it preceded the "Journey to Bethlehem". It is unclear whether this story was set before or after the Annunciation which, in the New Testament account, occurred after their betrothal but before their marriage. In the Gospel of James it comes after the Annunciation, but in the Gospel of Pseudo-Matthew, the primary source in the West, it comes before it.

Artists

The scene, or scenes, was a common component in larger cycles of the Life of the Virgin and thus very frequently found, especially in the Middle Ages; it is not found in the typical cycle in a Book of hours however. It was often a predella scene underneath the main scene in an altarpiece centred on Mary, 

The marriage scene has been painted by, among others, Giotto, Perugino, Raphael, Ventura Salimbeni (1613, his last painting), Domenico Ghirlandaio (1485-1490, at the Tornabuoni Chapel), Bernardo Daddi (now in the Royal Collection), Pieter van Lint (1640, Antwerp Cathedral), Tiburzio Baldini, Alfonso Rivarola, Francesco Caccianiga, Niccolò Berrettoni, Giovanni Jacopo Caraglio, Filippo Bellini, Veronese (in San Polo church, Venice), Giulio Cesare Milani, Franciabigio (in the Santissima Annunziata, Florence), and Giacomo di Castro.

References

External links 

 Aquinas, Thomas. "Summa Theologica III q29. Of the espousals of the Mother of God"
 Sansonvino, Andrea. The Wedding, marble sculpture, Loretto, Italy, (1526)

Christian iconography
Virgin Mary in art
Wedding
Saint Joseph (husband of Mary)